Chondrolepis nero, commonly known as the Cameroon snow-horned skipper, is a species of butterfly in the family Hesperiidae. It is found in Nigeria and Cameroon. The habitat consists of areas above an altitude of 1,500 meters near submontane forest.

References

Butterflies described in 1937
Hesperiinae